SUNY Erie is a public community college with three campuses in western New York that serve residents in and near Erie County. 

It is part of the State University of New York (SUNY) system and has locations in Williamsville (North Campus), Buffalo (City Campus within Old Post Office), and Orchard Park (South Campus).

The school's athletic teams are the Erie Kats. Athletic facilities include Burt Flickinger Center on the City Campus and West Herr Stadium on the South Campus.

Notable alumni
Antwon Burton, professional football player
Ryan Ciminelli, professional bowler
Arthur Eve, former Deputy Speaker of the New York State Assembly
Jody Fortson, professional football player
Joel Giambra, former county executive of Erie County, New York
Dean Evan Hart, optometrist
Norman McCombs, businessman
"Baby" Joe Mesi, professional boxer
Pat Occhiuto, professional soccer player
Michele Ragusa, actress
India Walton, former candidate for mayor of Buffalo, New York
John Wojcik, professional baseball player

References

External links 
 

Two-year colleges in the United States
Education in Buffalo, New York
SUNY community colleges
Educational institutions established in 1946
Universities and colleges in Erie County, New York
1946 establishments in New York (state)
NJCAA athletics